Notogibbula is a genus of sea snail, marine gastropod molluscs of the family Trochidae, the top shells.

Distribution
This marine genus is found off  the coast of Australia (New South Wales, Queensland, South Australia, Tasmania, Victoria and Western Australia). It also occurs in the Persian Gulf and in the Indian Ocean off Tanzania.

Species
According to the Indo-Pacific Molluscan Database, the following species with names in current use are included within the genus Notogibbula :
 Notogibbula bicarinata (Adams, 1854)
 Notogibbula lehmanni (Menke, 1843)
 Notogibbula preissiana (Philippi, 1849)
Species brought into synonymy
 Notogibbula maccullochi (Hedley, 1907): synonym of Eurytrochus maccullochi (Hedley, 1907)
 Notogibbula townsendi (Sowerby III, 1895): synonym of Agagus agagus Jousseaume, F.P., 1894

References

Further reading
 Williams S.T., Karube S. & Ozawa T. (2008) Molecular systematics of Vetigastropoda: Trochidae, Turbinidae and Trochoidea redefined. Zoologica Scripta 37: 483–506.

 
Trochidae
Gastropod genera